Sje (С́ с́; italics: С́ с́) is a letter of the Cyrillic alphabet, formed from С with the addition of an acute accent (not to be confused with the Latin letter Ć). It is used in the Montenegrin alphabet, where it represents the voiceless alveolo-palatal sibilant . 

It corresponds to the Latin Ś, and is not to be confused with the Latin Ć, which represents the voiceless alveolo-palatal affricate /t͡ɕ/ (the sound of Ћ)

Origins

It came into official use in mid-2009, with the adoption of the Law on the Official Language in Montenegro.

The letter originates from rural areas in Montenegro.

Computing codes
Being a relatively recent letter, not present in any legacy 8-bit Cyrillic encoding, the letter С́  is not represented directly by a precomposed character in Unicode either; it has to be composed as С+◌́ (U+0301).

See also 
Ś ś : Latin letter Ś
Ш ш : Cyrillic letter Sha
З́ з́ : Cyrillic letter Zje
Щ щ: Cyrillic letter Shcha
Ć ć : Latin letter C with acute
Cyrillic characters in Unicode

Cyrillic letters